Tuomas Vartiainen (born May 8, 1996) is a Finnish professional ice hockey right winger currently playing for IPK on loan from KalPa.

Vartiainen previously played for Kärpät, making his debut for the team on September 29, 2016 against HPK. He went on to play 11 games during the 2016–17 Liiga season and 12 games during the 2017–18 Liiga season. He also played seven games on loan at Jukurit during the 2017–18 season.

Vartiainen joined IPK of Mestis on May 11, 2018. On April 12, 2019, he received a try-out with IPK's parent club KalPa alongside Julius Rantaeskola. On September 23, 2019, the team announced that both Vartiainen and Rantaeskola would remain until the end of the season.

References

External links

1996 births
Living people
Finnish ice hockey right wingers
Hokki players
Iisalmen Peli-Karhut players
KalPa players
Kokkolan Hermes players
Mikkelin Jukurit players
Oulun Kärpät players
Sportspeople from Oulu